Gharibi may refer to:
Milad Gharibi (b. 1992), Iranian footballer
Gharibi, Iran, a village in Ilam Province
Music of Tajikistan